Blegen is a surname. People with that name include:

 Carl Blegen (1887-1971), American archaeologist, husband of Elizabeth
 Elizabeth Blegen (1888-1966), American archeologist, educator and writer, wife of Carl
 Judith Blegen (born 1943), American soprano
 Theodore C. Blegen (1891-1969), American historian and author

See also